A by-election was held for the New South Wales Legislative Assembly electorate of Wagga Wagga on 14 December 1957. The election was triggered by the death of  Eddie Graham.

Dates

Results

Eddie Graham died.

See also
Electoral results for the district of Wagga Wagga
List of New South Wales state by-elections

References 

1957 elections in Australia
New South Wales state by-elections
1950s in New South Wales